The Walker Tavern is a historic structure located at 11710 U.S. Route 12 in Cambridge Township in northwesternmost Lenawee County, Michigan.  It was designated as a Michigan Historic Site on February 19, 1958, and was later the county's first property added to the National Register of Historic Places on January 25, 1971.  The structure was incorporated into the Cambridge Junction Historic State Park and continues to serve as a museum and venue for various events.

History
This structure was built as a modest farmhouse around 1832 by an unknown architect in the style of Federal architecture.  It was built at the important intersection of the former Chicago Road (U.S Route 12) and the Monroe Pike (M-50). At some point, Calvin Snell began operating the building as a tavern for travelers along the road. In about 1838, Sylvester and Lucy Walker moved from New York State and likely began leasing the inn and tavern from Snell. In 1842, the Walkers purchased the tavern, renaming it the Walker Tavern.  In addition to a tavern, it also served as an inn for travelers from Monroe en route from Detroit to Chicago — a stagecoach trip that once took five days.  Famous guests included Daniel Webster and James Fenimore Cooper.  The structure served a variety of purposes, including a meeting place for religious and political gatherings.

Walker operated the tavern until about 1853, when he constructed a similar establishment, S. Walker's Hotel, across the street. In  1865, the older Walker Tavern was purchased by Francis A. Dewey. In 1921, Frederic Hewitt purchased the tavern and converted it into a museum.  In 1965, the Walker Tavern was sold to the Michigan DNR, and it underwent several alterations during a restoration process.

Description
The Walker Tavern is a two-story frame structure, sided with whitewood clapboard, and located on a low rise of ground. It is framed with hand-hewn white oak timbers about eight inches square. A basement of fieldstone extends under about half the building. The original portion of the tavern measures approximately 36 feet by 18 feet, and three major additions were made to the rear of the original structure, extending its depth.

References

External links

 Walker Tavern Historic Site - official site

Houses in Lenawee County, Michigan
Houses on the National Register of Historic Places in Michigan
Federal architecture in Michigan
Museums in Lenawee County, Michigan
Museums established in 1921
Houses completed in 1832
Michigan State Historic Sites
Taverns in Michigan
1921 establishments in Michigan
Historic house museums in Michigan
National Register of Historic Places in Lenawee County, Michigan
Drinking establishments on the National Register of Historic Places in Michigan